Ștefan Racoviță (1713 – 1782) was Prince of Wallachia, Romania, between 8 February 1764 and 29 August 1765.

References

Year of birth missing
Year of death missing
Rulers of Wallachia
Stefan